Cymbalophora oertzeni is a moth of the family Erebidae first described by Julius Lederer in 1855. It is found in Israel and Palestine.

References

Callimorphina
Moths described in 1855